Sponsume was an online multicurrency crowd funding platform founded by French entrepreneur Gregory Vincent in 2010. It stopped crowd funding services in 2014.

History 
As a doctoral student at Oxford University, Vincent developed a keen interest in the works of Muhammad Yunus, a pioneer of microfinance. Vincent saw in peer-to-peer microfinance a brilliant alternative to traditional methods for funding innovative ideas. The 2009 financial crisis and subsequent cuts to subsidies that hit the UK arts scene highlighted the need for an alternative, community-led way of raising funds for artists and innovators, prompting Vincent to launch Sponsume.

Model 
The site used the power of social networks and the wisdom of crowds to help fund a variety of projects ranging from films and documentaries, to music, theatre, photography, fashion, technology, scientific research, green and social enterprise. As of 2012, Sponsume has helped crowd fund over 1000 campaigns.

Project owners chose a timeframe deadline and a target funding goal. They created non-monetary rewards generally linked to their project. The site levied a 4% fee for successful campaigns and collects 9% for campaigns that failed to reach their target amount.

See also
 Comparison of crowd funding services

References

External links
 

Defunct crowdfunding platforms of the United Kingdom
Microfinance